At various dates in the run up to the 2015 general election, various organisations carried out opinion polling to gauge the opinions that voters hold towards political leaders. Results of such polls are displayed in this article. Most of the polling companies listed are members of the British Polling Council (BPC) and abide by its disclosure rules.

The date range for these opinion polls is from the previous general election, held on 6 May 2010, to the 7 May 2015.

Leadership approval ratings 

YouGov: "Is (Insert name here) doing their job well or badly?"
Ipsos MORI: "Are you satisfied or dissatisfied with the way (Insert name here) is doing his job as Prime Minister/Party leader?"

David Cameron 

The following polls asked about voters' opinions on David Cameron, Leader of the Conservatives and Prime Minister of the United Kingdom.

2015

2014

2013

2012

2011

2010

Ed Miliband 

The following polls asked about voters' opinions on Ed Miliband, Leader of the Labour Party.

2015

2014

2013

2012

2011

2010

Nick Clegg 

The following polls asked about voters' opinions on Nick Clegg, Leader of the Liberal Democrats and Deputy Prime Minister of the United Kingdom.

2015

2014

2013

2012

2011

2010

Nigel Farage 
The following polls asked about voters' opinions on Nigel Farage, Leader of the UKIP. Polls commence mostly from March 2014.

2015

2014

2013

See also 
 Opinion polling for the 2015 United Kingdom general election
 2015 United Kingdom general election

Notes

References

Leadership approval opinion polling for United Kingdom general elections